The Last Millionaire is a reality television show where young British entrepreneurs compete to create the most profitable businesses in six cities across the world. The winners rather than the losers are sent home. It was first broadcast in the UK on BBC Three starting 13 November 2008.

External links
 

2008 British television series debuts
2008 British television series endings
BBC Television shows
British reality television series
English-language television shows